The United Sons and Daughters of Charity Lodge Hall in Bolivar, Tennessee was built in c.1928 and was listed on the National Register of Historic Places in 2005.

It is an "unassuming" wood-frame building on brick piers, with a hipped roof.  The building was primarily used for religious worship services and for other community purposes.

It is a surviving artifact of the United Sons and Daughters of Charity, a local self-help and benevolent organization formed in 1873 by a group of African American men in Bolivar.

References

National Register of Historic Places in Tennessee
Hardeman County, Tennessee